Manuel de Faria e Sousa (18 March 1590 – 3 June 1649) was a Portuguese historian and poet. He frequently wrote in Spanish.

He was born of an ancient Portuguese noble family, probably at Pombeiro, studied in Braga for some years, and when about fourteen entered the service of the Bishop of Porto. With the exception of about four years, from 1631 to 1634, during which he was a member of the Portuguese embassy in Rome, the greater part of his later life was spent at Madrid, and there he died in June 1649.

He was married to Catarina Machado, the "Albania" of his poems, enabled him to lead a studious domestic life, dividing his cares and affections between his children and his books. His first important work, an Epitome de las historias Portuguezas (Madrid, 1628), was favorably received; but some passages in his enormous commentary upon Portuguese epic Os Lusíadas, the poem of Luís de Camões, excited the suspicion of the inquisitors, caused his temporary incarceration, and led to the permanent loss of his official salary. In spite of the enthusiasm which is said to have prescribed to him the daily task of twelve folio pages, death overtook him before he had completed his greatest enterprise, a history of the Portuguese in all parts of the world.

Several portions of the work appeared at Lisbon after his death, under the editorship of Captain Faria e Sousa : Europa Portugueza (1667, 3 vols.); Ásia Portugueza (1666–1675, 3 vols.); África Portugueza (1681). As a poet Faria e Sousa was nearly as prolific; but his poems are vitiated by the prevailing Gongorism of his time. They were for the most part collected in the Noches claras (Madrid, 1624–1626), and the Fuente de Aganipe, of which four volumes were published at Madrid in 1644-1646. He also wrote, from information supplied by P. A. Semmedo, Imperio de China i cultura evangelica en ~l (Madrid, 1642); and translated and completed the Nobiliário of the Count of Barcelos.

There are English translations by J. Stevens of the History of Portugal (London, 1698), and of Portuguese Asia (London, 1695).

Works

 Muerte de Jesus y llanto de Maria. Madrid, 1623
 Fabula de Narciso e Echo. Lisboa, 1623. In Portuguese
 Divinas e humanas flores. Madrid, por Diego Flameco 1624
 Noches claras. Madrid, por Diego Flameco 1624
 Fuente de Aganipe y Rimas varias. Madrid, por Sanchez 1644, 1646. In Portuguese and Spanish. In seven parts:

1a : 600 sonetos

2a : 12 "poemas em outava rythma, silvas e sextinas[1]"

3a : canções, odes, 200 madrigals ("madrigales"), sextinas e tercetos

4a : 20 eclogas

5a : redondilhas, glosas, cantilenas, decimas, romances e epigramas

6a : "Musa nueva" com sonetos, oitavas, tercetos, canções, etc. reduzidos a versos octosilabos

7a : "Engenho" de acrostichos, esdrúxulos, ecos, etc.

 Epithalamio de los casamientos de los señores Marqueses de Molina. Saragoça, 1624
 Epitome de las historias portuguesas. Madrid, por Francisco martinez 1628
Is the same work amplified later with the title of Europa portuguesa.
 Escuriale por Jacobum Gibbes Anglum. Madrid, 1658. tradução em castelhano duma descrição do Escurial em latim.
 Lusiadas de Luis de Camoens, principe de los poetas de España. Comentadas. Madrid, por Juan Sanches, 1639.
Say Faria, That begins this work in 1614, using 25 years, examining more than thousand authors, and between this ones 300 Italians.
 Informacion a favor de Manuel de faria y sousa etc., 1640
 Peregrino instruido
 Imperio de la China e cultura evangelica en el, etc.
 Nenia : poema acrostico a la reyna de España D. Isabel de Bourbon. Madrid, 1644
 Nobiliario del Conde de Barcellos D. Pedro, hijo delrey D. Dionis de Portugal, traducido etc. Madrid, 1646
 El gran justicia de Aragon Don Martin Baptista de Lanuza. Madrid, 1650
 Asia Portuguesa. 3 tomos :
1° Lisboa, Henrique Valente de Oliveira, 1666 : History of Índia, since it discovery until 1538.

2° Lisboa, Antonio Craesbeeck de Mello, 1674 : History of Índia, from 1538 to 1581

3° Lisboa, ibidem, 1675 : History of Índia, during the Spanish dominion (1581 - 1640).
 Europa Portuguesa. 3 tomos :
1° Lisboa, Antonio Craesbeeck de Mello, 1678 : From universal diluvio  to Portugal with king.

2° Lisboa, Ibid, 1679 : From Government of Count D. Henrique to D. João III.

3° Lisboa, Ibid, 1680 : From king D. Sebastião to Filipe III of Portugal.
 África Portuguesa. Lisboa, Antonio Craesbeeck de Mello, 1681 : History of conquest from D. João I to year 1562.
 Rimas varias de Luis de Camoens, etc. comentadas. Lisboa, Theotonio Damaso de Mello, 1685.

References

Footnotes

Sources

1590 births
1649 deaths
Portuguese chroniclers
17th-century Portuguese poets
Portuguese male poets
Maritime history of Portugal
17th-century Portuguese historians
17th-century male writers
Portuguese emigrants to Spain